The 1990 Tour of Britain was the fourth edition of the Kellogg's Tour of Britain cycle race and was held from 31 July to 5 August 1990. The race started in Brighton and finished in Manchester. The race was won by Michel Dernies of the Weinmann team.

Route

General classification

References

1990
Tour of Britain
Tour of Britain
July 1990 sports events in the United Kingdom
August 1990 sports events in the United Kingdom